Solidarity or solidarism is an awareness of shared interests, objectives, standards, and sympathies creating a psychological sense of unity of groups or classes. It is based on class collaboration and rejects class conflict. Unlike collectivism, solidarism does not reject individuals and sees individuals as the basis of society. It refers to the ties in a society that bind people together as one. The term is generally employed in sociology and the other social sciences as well as in philosophy and bioethics. It is also a significant concept in Catholic social teaching; therefore it is a core concept in Christian democratic political ideology.

What forms the basis of solidarity and how it is implemented vary between societies. In Global South societies it may be mainly based on kinship and shared values while Global North societies accumulate various theories as to what contributes to a sense of solidarity, or rather, social cohesion.

Solidarity is also one of six principles of the Charter of Fundamental Rights of the European Union and December 20 of each year is International Human Solidarity Day recognized as an international observance. Concepts of solidarity are mentioned in the Universal Declaration on Bioethics and Human Rights, but not defined clearly. As biotechnology and biomedical enhancement research and production increase, the need for distinct definition of solidarity within healthcare system frameworks is important. It is not mentioned in the European Convention on Human Rights nor in the United Nations' Universal Declaration of Human Rights and has hence lesser legal meaning when compared to basic rights.

Discourse

Émile Durkheim 
According to Émile Durkheim, the types of social solidarity correlate with types of society. Durkheim introduced the terms mechanical and organic solidarity as part of his theory of the development of societies in The Division of Labour in Society (1893). In a society exhibiting mechanical solidarity, its cohesion and integration comes from the homogeneity of individuals—people feel connected through similar work, educational and religious training, and lifestyle. Mechanical solidarity normally operates in traditional small-scale societies.  In tribal society, solidarity is usually based on kinship ties of familial networks. Organic solidarity comes from the interdependence that arises from specialization of work and the complementarities between people—a development which occurs in modern and industrial societies.

Although individuals perform different tasks and often have different values and interest, the order and very solidarity of society depends on their reliance on each other to perform their specified tasks. "Organic" here refers to the interdependence of the component parts, and thus social solidarity is maintained in more complex societies through the interdependence of its component parts (e.g., farmers produce the food to feed the factory workers who produce the tractors that allow the farmer to produce the food).

Peter Kropotkin 

A connection between the biological and the social was of principal importance for the idea of solidarity as expressed by the anarchist ideologist and former Prince Peter Kropotkin (1842–1921). In his most famous book, Mutual Aid: A Factor of Evolution (1902), written partly in response to Huxleyan Social Darwinism, Kropotkin studied the use of cooperation as a survival mechanism in human societies at their various stages, as well as with animals. According to him, mutual aid, or cooperation, within a species has been an important factor in the evolution of social institutions. Solidarity is essential for mutual aid; supportive activity towards other people does not result from the expectation of reward, but rather from instinctive feelings of solidarity.

In his introduction to the book, Kropotkin wrote: "The number and importance of mutual-aid institutions which were developed by the creative genius of the savage and half-savage masses, during the earliest clan-period of mankind and still more during the next village-community period, and the immense influence which these early institutions have exercised upon the subsequent development of mankind, down to the present times, induced me to extend my researches to the later, historical periods as well; especially, to study that most interesting period – the free medieval city republics, whose universality and influence upon our modern civilization have not yet been duly appreciated. And finally, I have tried to indicate in brief the immense importance which the mutual-support instincts, inherited by mankind from its extremely long evolution, play even now in our modern society, which is supposed to rest upon the principle "every one for himself, and the State for all," but which it never has succeeded, nor will succeed in realizing". Kropotkin advocated an alternative economic and social system, which would be coordinated through a horizontal network of voluntary associations with goods distributed in compliance with the physical needs of the individual, rather than according to labour.

Bioethics 
Solidarity is a re-emerging concept in contemporary philosophy within various sub-fields of law, ethics, and political philosophy. Early ancient philosophers such as Socrates and Aristotle discuss solidarity as a virtue ethics framework because in order to live a good life one must perform actions and behave in a way that is in solidarity with the community.

One notable approach in bioethics is to identify solidarity primarily as a three-tiered practice enacted at the interpersonal, communal, and contractual and legal levels. This approach is driven by the quest to differentiate between the diverse applications of the concept and to clarify its meaning, both historically and in terms of its potential as a fruitful concept for contemporary moral, social and political issues. The modern practice of bioethics is significantly influenced by Immanuel Kant's concept of the Categorical Imperative. Pastor and philosopher Fritz Jahr's article "Bio-Ethics: A Review of the Ethical Relationships of Humans to Animals and Plants" refines Kant's original Categorical Imperative discourse by including the notion of the Bioethical Imperative.

Biomedical technology has also further introduced solidarity as the pivotal concept in bioethics. Scholars, such as Ori Levi, bring to attention the negative implications of biomedical enhancements. Another scholar, Dr. Meulen ter Ruud, discusses the application of solidarity within healthcare systems.

Imperative 
Fritz Jahr describes that bioethics is ultimately made up of "academic discipline, principle, and virtue". This echoes back to the deep influence Socrates has on the normalization of bioethics and its practices. Jahr utilizes Kant's Categorical Imperative to demonstrate the obligatory, yet innately human practice of the Bioethical Imperative:"This results in the guiding principle for our actions is the Bioethical Imperative: Respect every living being in general as an end in itself, and treat it if possible, as such"as it arises in the relationships not only between conscious human being, but also with plants and other animal species. Jahr fully believes that in order to truly practice bioethics, one must be in solidarity with all forms of life. If one only decides to be in solidarity in humans, then one should not behave virtuously in any manner.

Catholic social teaching 

Solidarity is an integral element of Catholic social teaching. According to Pope Francis:

The Church's teaching on solidarity is explained in the Compendium of the Social Doctrine of the Church, and briefly summarised in the Catechism of the Catholic Church:1939. The principle of solidarity, also articulated in terms of "friendship" or "social charity," is a direct demand of human and Christian brotherhood
1940. Solidarity is manifested in the first place by the distribution of goods and remuneration for work ...
1941. Socio-economic problems can be resolved only with the help of all the forms of solidarity: solidarity of the poor among themselves, between rich and poor, of workers among themselves, between employers and employees in a business, solidarity among nations and peoples. International solidarity is a requirement of the moral order; world peace depends in part upon this
1942. The virtue of solidarity goes beyond material goods. In spreading the spiritual goods of the faith, the Church has promoted, and often opened new paths for, the development of temporal goods as well. And so throughout the centuries has the Lord's saying been verified: "Seek first his kingdom and his righteousness, and all these things shall be yours as well."

See also 

Altruism
Autarky
Classism
Corporatism
Generalized exchange
Group cohesiveness
Hierarchy
Linked fate
Solidarism
Solidarity economy

Notes

References

Further reading 
 Solidarity as a Principle of International Law: Its Application in Consensual Intervention – article by Themistoklis Tzimas, GroJIL Vol 6, No 2 (2018): International Legal Reformation
 Solidarity: Obligations and Expressions – paper by Ashley Taylor at Social Policy, The University of Edinburgh, January 2014
 Towards a Social Contract on Worldwide Scale, book by Guy-Ankerl  : Solidarity Contract, Geneva, ILO, 1980, 
 Solidarity and Responsibility in Health Care – article by Ben Davies and Julian Savulescu, Public Health Ethics, Volume 12, Issue 2, July 2019, Pages 133–144, 4 July 2019
   Afterword: What Solidarity of the Future? – article by Jacek Kołtan in: Solidarity and the Crisis of Trust, ed. Jacek Koltan, European Solidarity Centre: Gdansk 2016, pp. 133–143

Altruism
Community building
Sociological terminology
Virtue